Drum Brae/Gyle is one of the seventeen wards used to elect members of the City of Edinburgh Council. Established in 2007 along with the other wards, it currently elects three Councillors.

The ward covers an area in the far west of the city, bounded generally by Corstorphine Hill, the Queensferry Road (A90), Maybury Road (A902) and Edinburgh City Bypass (A720) roads, and the Glasgow–Edinburgh via Falkirk line railway; it includes the Bughtlin, Clermiston, Clerwood, Craigmount, Drumbrae, East Craigs, Gogarloch, Maybury, North Gyle, Parkgrove, South Gyle and West Craigs neighbourhoods, as well as the Edinburgh Park commercial district. A minor boundary change in 2017 caused the loss of the Wester Broom neighbourhood and the addition of Forrester with a negligible effect on the population, which in 2019 stood at 23,534.

Councillors

Election Results

2022 Election
2022 City of Edinburgh Council election

2017 Election
2017 City of Edinburgh Council election

On 17 July 2018, SNP councillor Claire Bridgman resigned from the party for undisclosed reasons and became an Independent.

2012 Election
2012 City of Edinburgh Council election

2007 Election
2007 City of Edinburgh Council election

References

External links
Listed Buildings in Drum Brae/Gyle Ward, City of Edinburgh at British Listed Buildings

Wards of Edinburgh